Oreosaurus rhodogaster is a species of lizard in the family Gymnophthalmidae. It is endemic to Venezuela.

References

Oreosaurus
Reptiles of Venezuela
Endemic fauna of Venezuela
Reptiles described in 2005
Taxa named by Gilson Rivas
Taxa named by Walter E. Schargel
Taxa named by Jesse M. Meik
Taxobox binomials not recognized by IUCN